Imtiaz Ahmed PP, (5 January 1928 – 31 December 2016) was a cricketer who played for Pakistan's first Test team in 1952 and in 40 subsequent Test matches. He played in Pakistan's first 39 Test matches, setting a record for the most consecutive Tests played from a team's inaugural match.

Biography 

Born in Lahore, Ahmed was educated at Islamia College Lahore. He played in 41 Tests and scored over 2000 runs. He was a middle order batsman who also sometimes batted in the top order. He was Pakistan's second Test wicketkeeper as Hanif Mohammad had kept wickets in Pakistan's inaugural Test. He made the first Test double hundred by a wicketkeeper when he scored 209 against New Zealand in October 1955.

On 6 March 1951, playing for India Prime Minister's XI against a Commonwealth XI, Ahmed scored a triple century (300 not out) while following on, a feat that has been achieved by only two others. He received Pride of Performance Award from the Government of Pakistan for sports in 1966.

Ahmed also played in the Ranji Trophy in India.

Ahmed died in Lahore, Punjab on 31 December 2016 due to a chest infection. He was 88 years old.

References

External links

1928 births
2016 deaths
Combined Services (Pakistan) cricketers
Northern India cricketers
North Zone cricketers
North Zone (Pakistan) cricketers
Pakistan Air Force cricketers
Pakistani cricketers
Pakistan Test cricket captains
Pakistan Test cricketers
Pakistan Universities cricketers
Punjab (Pakistan) cricketers
Punjab University cricketers
Rawalpindi cricketers
Recipients of the Pride of Performance
Cricketers from Lahore
Government Islamia College alumni
Wicket-keepers
People from Lahore